Guten Morgen, Mallorca (translated: Good Morning, Majorca) was a German television series set on the island of Majorca.

Situation 
Every morning the radio host, Peter Ostermann, welcomes his listeners on the Mediterranean island with the words "Good morning, Majorca". His wife Iris, who lives in Germany, wants to pursue her own career but always keeps their love life in mind. The Marlene Bar in Majorca is a favourite with tourists and local workers and is the starting point of several stories.

Guest stars (selection) 
 Diana Körner
 Jochen Busse
 Oliver Clemens
 Manfred Lehmann
 Lara Joy Körner
 Martin Semmelrogge
 Sonja Kirchberger
 Ralph Schicha
 Nadja Tiller

External links
 

1996 German television series debuts
1996 German television series endings
Television shows set in the Balearic Islands
German-language television shows
RTL (German TV channel) original programming